
This is a list of postal codes in Canada where the first letter is T. Postal codes beginning with T are located within the Canadian province of Alberta. Only the first three characters are listed, corresponding to the forward sortation area (FSA).

Canada Post provides a free postal code look-up tool on its website, via its applications for smartphones, and sells hard-copy directories and CD-ROMs. Many vendors also sell validation tools, which allow customers to properly match addresses and postal codes. Hard-copy directories can also be consulted in all post offices, and some libraries.

Alberta - 156 FSAs

Urban

Alberta - 157 FSAs

Rural

References

External links
Canada Post. Alberta postal code map

Communications in Alberta
T
Postal codes T